Jyväskylä sub-region  is a subdivision of Central Finland and one of the Sub-regions of Finland since 2009. It covers the area around the city of Jyväskylä. With its 178 413 inhabitants it is 6th biggest sub-region in Finland.

Municipalities
Hankasalmi
Jyväskylä
Laukaa
Muurame
Petäjävesi
Toivakka
Uurainen

Politics
Results of the 2018 Finnish presidential election:

 Sauli Niinistö   60.5%
 Pekka Haavisto   15.0%
 Laura Huhtasaari   6.9%
 Paavo Väyrynen   6.6%
 Matti Vanhanen   3.9%
 Tuula Haatainen   3.4%
 Merja Kyllönen   3.1%
 Nils Torvalds   0.5%

Gallery

External links
 Municipality of Hankasalmi
 City of Jyväskylä 
 Municipality of Laukaa
 Municipality of Muurame
 Municipality of Petäjävesi 
 Municipality of Toivakka
 Municipality of Uurainen

Sub-regions of Finland
Geography of Central Finland